= The Pagan Middle Ages =

Academic anthology

- The front cover to the English translation, depicting an illustration of The Pantheon in Rome taken from Les merveilles de la ville de Rome (1700).
- Author: Ludo J.R. Milis
- Language: Dutch, English (translation).
- Subject: Medieval History, Religious History
- Publisher: Institut Historique Belge de Rome, Boydell Press (trans.)
- Publication date: 1991, 1998 (trans.)
- Publication place: Belgium
- Media type: Print (Hardcover)
- Pages: 160
- ISBN: 978-0851156385

The Pagan Middle Ages is an academic anthology edited by the Belgian historian Ludo J.R. Milis. Containing eight papers by various Dutch and Belgian historians and archaeologists, it is devoted to the study of how various pre-Christian religious beliefs and practices survived and were absorbed into the new, Christian society in Europe during the Middle Ages. It was first published by the Institut Historique Belge de Rome in 1991 under the Dutch title of De Heidense Middeleeuwen and subsequently translated into English by Tanis Guest and published by The Boydell Press in 1998.

== Synopsis ==
=== Milis' "Introduction" ===
"The title 'The Pagan Middle Ages' is not... a contradiction in terms. It is not intended to be provocative, and is no more an exaggeration than the term 'the Christian Middle Ages'. It rests on a complex reality in which all manner of religious ideas, old and new, confront each other.

— Ludo Milis, 1998 [1991].

Ludo Milis' opening chapter, entitled "Introduction: The Pagan Middle Ages - a contradiction in terms?", begins by examining the use of "medieval" as a derogatory term that has been used to refer to things that are "old-fashioned, primitive or barbarous." He contrasts this with the view of the Middle Ages as a time when the Christian Church rose to power in Europe, bringing with it an "idealised order" of morality and obedience to divine authority. Milis then proceeds to discuss the manner in which contemporary Europeans have projected elements of their own time onto the Middle Ages, for instance noting that modern champions of European unity have praised the Medieval Emperor Charlemagne – rather than Julius Caesar, Napoleon Bonaparte or Adolf Hitler – as the "Father of Europe".

The rest of the chapter is devoted to discussing whether historians and archaeologists can talk of a "Pagan Middle Ages", arguing that there was no such thing as a monolithic Christianity in medieval Europe, but a variety of different religious positions across the continent. In this context, Milis argues, various "pagan rites, usages, ideas and ways of presenting things" were accepted into Christianity in different parts of Europe. He criticises the assumption of some earlier scholars that Christianity simply swept away the earlier pagan religions as it spread across Europe, highlighting the comparisons that could be made with the religious beliefs of indigenous peoples in Central and South America, or the black population of the Caribbean, all of which show a great deal of syncreticism between Christianity and older, traditional religion.
